Pictetia mucronata is a species of flowering plant in the family Fabaceae. It is found only in Cuba.

References

Dalbergieae
Flora of Cuba
Vulnerable plants
Flora without expected TNC conservation status